Solano Cassamajor (born November 21, 1995) is a Belgian male acrobatic gymnast. Along with his partner, Yana Vastavel, he finished 4th in the 2014 Acrobatic Gymnastics World Championships.

References

External links

 

1995 births
Living people
Belgian acrobatic gymnasts
Male acrobatic gymnasts
Belgian sportsmen
Gymnasts at the 2015 European Games
European Games medalists in gymnastics
European Games silver medalists for Belgium
People from Willebroek
Sportspeople from Antwerp Province
21st-century Belgian people